The 2015–16 VfL Bochum season was the 78th season in club history.

Review and events
Simon Terodde set a new record for the number of 2. Bundesliga goals for the club. After Terodde tied Peter Peschel's old record of 28 goals on 27 February 2016 against SV Sandhausen, he broke it on 1 March 2016 with his goal against Fortuna Düsseldorf.

Matches

Legend

Friendly matches

2. Bundesliga

League table

Results summary

Results by round

Matches

DFB-Pokal

Squad

Squad and statistics

Squad, appearances and goals scored

|}

Transfers

Summer

In:

Out:

Winter

In:

Out:

Sources

External links
 2015–16 VfL Bochum season at Weltfussball.de 
 2015–16 VfL Bochum season at kicker.de 
 2015–16 VfL Bochum season at Fussballdaten.de 

Bochum
VfL Bochum seasons